Agent Axis, in comics, may refer to:

 Agent Axis (DC Comics), two DC Comics supervillains 
 Agent Axis (Marvel Comics), a Marvel Comics supervillain